Pou Sheng International (Holdings) Limited, or Pou Sheng International, is a sportswear retailer in Mainland China under the brand of YYsports. In 2008, Pou Sheng International was spun off from its parent company, Yue Yuen Industrial Holdings, and listed on the Hong Kong Stock Exchange with its IPO price of HK$2.93 per share. Its brand portfolio of footwear as Nike, Adidas, SKECHERS, PUMA, Converse, etc.

See also
Pou Chen Corporation
Yue Yuen Industrial Holdings

References

External links
Pou Sheng International (Holdings) Limited
YYsports

Companies listed on the Hong Kong Stock Exchange
Retail companies established in 1992
Privately held companies of China
Shoe companies of Taiwan
Pou Chen Group